Chaika Motorsports Complex, also known as Autodrome Chaika, is a motorsport racetrack in Ukraine, situated in Chaiky village, near the capital city Kyiv. The circuit was built in 1975., when the country was a part of Soviet Union, since the foundation of Fédération Automobile de l'Ukraine (FAU) in 1993, it hosts various regional racing series, such as Ukrainian Touring Championship and Superbike Ukraine.

History

Soviet era 
The development of the circuit began in 60's by Soviet DOSAAF, a society for cooperation with army, aviation and navy, which also built an airfield next to the track, carrying the same name. The configuration was based on various similar tracks of that time, the project was finished in 1971. The construction began in 1973 and finished in several years.

Chaika was very popular and known as the best track in USSR due to very fast sectors of the 'big ring' and corners 2-4, that were known as so-called 'ears'. The track was pretty difficult and dangerous, there was no runoffs, very close  barriers, poor quality asphalt and bad landscaping.

June 27, 1975 circuit saw its first touring races, after that the dirt speedway was added to complex as a second construction phase. Later that year the circuit began to host the USSR Circuit Racing Championship, that included formula racing.

Next year the circuit hosted its first international series, called Socialist Nations Friendship Cup, becoming the traditional season opener. After a serious crash of Polish driver Christian Grochowski in 1983 that turned out fatal because of organizers' mistake the track was decided being unsafe and the series moved to Biķernieki track in Riga.

Without the famous championship racing organization quality fell down, there were a rare races with usually small amount of spectators due to lack of advertising. There were several attempts to change the bad asphalt, but they've made the situation even worse. In 1989 it was planned to invite an Austrian company to hold a reconstruction of the complex to raise the level of the track and to attract more tourists, but that never happened.

Independent Ukraine 
After the dissolution of the USSR in 1991, the Defense Assistance Society of Ukraine became the circuit's owner. They've had no money to take a good care of it and started selling all the equipment to private owners. In 1994 the track starts to host the Ukrainian Circuit Racing Championship. The safety standards of the track were still very low and the asphalt state kept getting worse, so after 1998 the circuit was excluded from calendar.

In 2001 Ukrainian Karting Federation reconstructed the karting circuit and it began to host races. The main circuit remained unused.

The head of the circuit was a Ukrainian racer Leonid Protasov. After the championship faced troubles due to bad economical state of the country and a lack of circuits, he got an agreement with Sergiy Malyk, the head of Kyiv Automotive and Motorcycle Club to host a full season at Chaika in 2004, but the track needed a reconstruction, so it was started immediately, but it took so much time, that the works passed deadline and the whole season was cancelled.

In 2005 Chaika the reconstruction was finished, the smaller ring layout was added for circuit racing while the bigger one was left for drag racing due to its long straights. Now the circuit had a bleachers for spectators, cafe and hotel. Later, the new pitlane was built on a smaller ring alongside the new final corner with an entrance into it, it made an already hard track even more tricky. The historical racing events began to use a reverse layout of Chaika.

During Russian full-scale invasion 
24 February 2022 Russia invaded Kyiv and Kyiv Oblast. 3 March Chaiky village was attacked as well, the warehouse facilities near the track were bombed and a big fire had started, its smoke had covered the residential buildings around. After the liberation of Kyiv Oblast Ukrainian racing driver Ivan Peklin in his Instagram had shown how the karting circuit where his career has started looks like. The pitlane building had its windows shattered and the boxes were burnt down as well as the civil cars, that were parked around them.

References

External links 
 kievring.com

Sports venues in Kyiv Oblast
Motorsport in Ukraine
Motorsport venues